Cychrus is a large genus of rare snail-eating beetles in the family Carabidae. There are at least 160 described species in Cychrus. They are found throughout the world, although more than 80 percent of the species occur in China.

Cychrus species
These 160 species belong to the genus Cychrus.

 Cychrus aeneus Fischer von Waldheim, 1824  (Palearctic)
 Cychrus altitudinum Deuve, 1998  (China)
 Cychrus anatolicus Motschulsky, 1866  (Turkey)
 Cychrus angulicollis Sella, 1874  (France and Italy)
 Cychrus angustatus Hoppe & Hornschuch, 1825  (worldwide)
 Cychrus angustior Kleinfeld, 2000  (China)
 Cychrus angustitarsalis Deuve, 1991  (China)
 Cychrus anomalognathus Imura & Cavazzuti, 2018  (China)
 Cychrus attenuatus (Fabricius, 1792)  (worldwide)
 Cychrus auvrayorum Deuve & Mourzine, 1997  (China)
 Cychrus barkamensis Deuve, 1991  (China)
 Cychrus baxiensis Deuve, 1997  (China)
 Cychrus becvari Deuve, 2018  (China)
 Cychrus benesi Deuve, 1996  (China)
 Cychrus bisetosus Deuve, 1995  (China)
 Cychrus bispinosus Deuve, 1989  (China)
 Cychrus boulbeni Deuve, 1997  (China)
 Cychrus bruggei Deuve, 1991  (China)
 Cychrus busatoi Cavazzuti, 2009  (China)
 Cychrus businskyianus Imura, 2000  (China)
 Cychrus businskyorum Imura, 2000  (China)
 Cychrus caraboides (Linnaeus, 1758)  (snail hunter)  (worldwide)
 Cychrus cavazzutii Deuve, 2002  (China)
 Cychrus cerberus Cavazzuti, 2007  (China)
 Cychrus chareti Deuve, 1993  (China)
 Cychrus colasi Deuve, 1994  (China)
 Cychrus coptolabroides Imura & Cavazzuti, 2017  (China)
 Cychrus cordicollis Chaudoir, 1835  (Europe)
 Cychrus cordithorax Deuve, 2007  (China)
 Cychrus cyaneomelas Deuve, 2010
 Cychrus cylindricollis Pini, 1871  (Italy)
 Cychrus dacatrai Deuve, 1992  (China)
 Cychrus daochengicus Deuve, 1989  (China)
 Cychrus davidis Fairmaire, 1886  (China)
 Cychrus deuveianus Cavazzuti, 1998  (China)
 Cychrus dolichognathus Deuve, 1990  (China)
 Cychrus dufouri Chaudoir, 1869  (France and Spain)
 Cychrus elongaticeps Deuve, 1992  (China)
 Cychrus elongatulus Deuve, 2001  (China)
 Cychrus evae Häckel & Sehnal, 2007  (China)
 Cychrus forceps Imura & Cavazzuti, 2017  (China)
 Cychrus fugongensis Imura & Cavazzuti, 2018  (China)
 Cychrus furumii Deuve, 1990  (China)
 Cychrus gorodinskiellus Deuve, 2016  (China)
 Cychrus gorodinskiorum Deuve, 2013  (China)
 Cychrus grajus K. & J.Daniel, 1898  (Italy)
 Cychrus grumulifer Deuve, 1994  (China)
 Cychrus haesitans Cavazzuti, 2007  (China)
 Cychrus hampei Gestro, 1875  (Bosnia-Herzegovina and Croatia)
 Cychrus heishuiensis Deuve, 2004  (China)
 Cychrus hemphillii G. Horn, 1879  (North America)
 Cychrus horribilis Deuve, 2016  (China)
 Cychrus huyaensis Imura & Cavazzuti, 2018  (China)
 Cychrus inexpectatior Deuve, 1991  (China)
 Cychrus inframontes Cavazzuti, 2007  (China)
 Cychrus inops Deuve, 1997  (China)
 Cychrus italicus Bonelli, 1810  (Europe)
 Cychrus janatai Deuve, 2001  (China)
 Cychrus jiaolieshanus Imura & Cavazzuti, 2019  (China)
 Cychrus jinchuanensis Deuve & Tian, 2007  (China)
 Cychrus jinpingshanus Imura & Cavazzuti, 2017  (China)
 Cychrus jirouxi Deuve, 2006  (China)
 Cychrus jiulongensis Deuve, 1994  (China)
 Cychrus kabakianus Imura & Cavazzuti, 2017  (China)
 Cychrus kalabi Deuve, 1991  (China)
 Cychrus kalabianus Deuve, 2019  (China)
 Cychrus kangensis Deuve & Tian, 2013  (China)
 Cychrus kaznakovi Semenov & Znojko, 1934  (China)
 Cychrus keithi Deuve, 1998  (China)
 Cychrus koiwayai Deuve & Imura, 1993  (China)
 Cychrus korotyaevi Deuve, 1991  (China)
 Cychrus kozlovi Semenov & Znojko, 1934  (China)
 Cychrus kralianus Deuve, 1996  (China)
 Cychrus kryzhanovskii Deuve, 2000  (China)
 Cychrus kubani Deuve, 1992  (China)
 Cychrus kvetoslavae Deuve, 2006  (China)
 Cychrus lajinensis Deuve & Tian, 2002  (China)
 Cychrus lanpingensis Deuve, 1997  (China)
 Cychrus lecordieri Deuve, 1990  (China)
 Cychrus lianghensis Cavazzuti, 2008  (China)
 Cychrus liei Kleinfeld, 2003  (China)
 Cychrus lilianae Cavazzuti, 1997  (China)
 Cychrus liuyei Deuve & Tian, 2013  (China)
 Cychrus loccai Cavazzuti, 1997  (China)
 Cychrus luctifer Deuve, 1991  (China)
 Cychrus ludmilae Imura, 1999  (China)
 Cychrus luhuo Deuve, 1994  (China)
 Cychrus luojiensis Cavazzuti, 1998  (China)
 Cychrus luolaluokuanus Imura & Cavazzuti, 2019  (China)
 Cychrus maoxianicus Deuve & Mourzine, 2000  (China)
 Cychrus marcilhaci Deuve, 1992  (China)
 Cychrus minjiangicus Deuve, 2009  (China)
 Cychrus minshanicola Deuve, 1987  (China)
 Cychrus miroslavi Deuve, 2006  (China)
 Cychrus moerkuaicus Deuve & Tian, 2007  (China)
 Cychrus morawitzi Géhin, 1885  (Asia)
 Cychrus morvani Deuve, 1998  (China)
 Cychrus motianling Imura & Cavazzuti, 2018  (China)
 Cychrus mugecuo Deuve, 1994  (China)
 Cychrus muliensis Deuve, 1992  (China)
 Cychrus naviauxi Deuve & Mourzine, 1998  (China)
 Cychrus nixiensis Imura & Cavazzuti, 2018  (China)
 Cychrus ombrophilus Deuve, 1990  (China)
 Cychrus pangi Deuve & Tian, 2004  (China)
 Cychrus paraxiei Cavazzuti, 2009  (China)
 Cychrus pentaploidus Deuve, 2010  (China)
 Cychrus pratti Breuning, 1946  (China)
 Cychrus procerus Cavazzuti, 1998  (China)
 Cychrus prosciai Cavazzuti, 2010  (China)
 Cychrus pseudokoiwayai Deuve, 1998  (China)
 Cychrus puchneri Kleinfeld, 2016  (China)
 Cychrus puetzi Kleinfeld & Korell&Wrase, 1996  (China)
 Cychrus quadrisetifer Imura, 1998  (China)
 Cychrus remondi Deuve, 1999  (China)
 Cychrus reni Deuve & Tian, 2013  (China)
 Cychrus reuteri Kleinfeld, 2018  (China)
 Cychrus riwaensis Deuve, 2006  (China)
 Cychrus rosti Roeschke, 1907  (Georgia and Russia)
 Cychrus rostislavi Deuve, 2009  (China)
 Cychrus rugicollis K. & J.Daniel, 1898  (Bosnia-Herzegovina)
 Cychrus rugocephalus Deuve, 2014  (China)
 Cychrus sabdensis Deuve, 1994  (China)
 Cychrus sars Imura & Häckel, 2003  (China)
 Cychrus schmidtii Chaudoir, 1837  (Europe)
 Cychrus schneideri Imura, 1997  (China)
 Cychrus sehnali Häckel, 2007  (China)
 Cychrus sellemi Deuve, 2002  (China)
 Cychrus semelai Deuve, 1997  (China)
 Cychrus semigranosus Palliardi, 1825  (worldwide)
 Cychrus seriatus Roeschke, 1907  (China)
 Cychrus shangrilanus Imura & Cavazzuti, 2017  (China)
 Cychrus shankoucola Deuve, 1994  (China)
 Cychrus shanxiensis Deuve, 2005  (China)
 Cychrus signatus Faldermann, 1836  (Georgia and Turkey)
 Cychrus sinicus Deuve, 1989  (China)
 Cychrus sola Cavazzuti, 1997  (China)
 Cychrus songpanensis Deuve, 1991  (China)
 Cychrus spinicollis L.Dufour, 1857  (Spain)
 Cychrus starcki Reitter, 1888  (Georgia and Russia)
 Cychrus stoetzneri Roeschke, 1923  (China)
 Cychrus szetshuanus Breuning, 1931  (China)
 Cychrus thibetanus Fairmaire, 1893  (China)
 Cychrus tubaemons Imura & Cavazzuti, 2017  (China)
 Cychrus tuberculatus T. Harris, 1839  (North America)
 Cychrus turnai Deuve, 1994  (China)
 Cychrus uenoi Imura, 1995  (China)
 Cychrus vignai Cavazzuti, 2011  (China)
 Cychrus wuyipeng Deuve, 1992  (China)
 Cychrus xiei Deuve, 1989  (China)
 Cychrus yadingensis Deuve, 2006  (China)
 Cychrus yajiangensis Deuve & Mourzine, 1998  (China)
 Cychrus yi Cavazzuti, 2001  (China)
 Cychrus yulongxuicus Deuve, 1991  (China)
 Cychrus yunnanus Fairmaire, 1887  (China)
 Cychrus zhimahensis Imura & Cavazzuti, 2019  (China)
 Cychrus zhoui Imura & Su&Osawa, 1998  (China)
 Cychrus zoigeicus Deuve, 1990  (China)
 Cychrus zuopengensis Imura & Cavazzuti, 2019  (China)
 † Cychrus minor G.Horn, 1876
 † Cychrus wheatleyi G.Horn, 1876

References

 
Carabidae genera